Konstantin Volkov may refer to:

 Konstantin Volkov (pole vaulter) (born 1960), retired pole vaulter who represented the USSR
 Konstantin Volkov (ice hockey, born 1985), Russian professional ice hockey player 
 Konstantin Volkov (ice hockey, born 1997), Russian professional ice hockey goaltender
 Konstantin Volkov (diplomat) (died 1945), NKVD agent and would-be defector
 Konstantin Valkov, a Russian former cosmonaut